Molodyozhny is a rural locality (a settlement) in Novopostoyalovskoye Rural Settlement, Rossoshansky District, Voronezh Oblast, Russia. The population was 289 as of 2010. There are 5 streets.

Geography 
Molodyozhny is located 6 km northeast of Rossosh (the district's administrative centre) by road. Khersonsky is the nearest rural locality.

References 

Rural localities in Rossoshansky District